Piano Concerto No. 2 in B-flat Major may refer to:

 Piano Concerto No. 2 (Beethoven)
 Piano Concerto No. 2 (Brahms)